Nico Knystock (born 19 October 1995) is a German footballer who plays for VfB Oldenburg in the Regionalliga Nord. He plays as a left-back.

Club career 
Knystock was born in Osnabrück. He joined Borussia Dortmund in 2009 from VfL Osnabrück. He made his professional debut in the 3. Liga at 22 August 2014 against SG Sonnenhof Großaspach. He played the first 87 minutes of the game, before being substituted by Mohamed El Bouazzati.

References 

1995 births
Living people
Sportspeople from Osnabrück
German footballers
Footballers from Lower Saxony
Association football defenders
3. Liga players
Regionalliga players
Borussia Dortmund II players
SV Rödinghausen players
VfB Oldenburg players